Simone Muratelli is an Italian motorcycle speedway rider who was a member of Italy team at 2003 Speedway World Cup.

See also 
 Italy national speedway team

References 

Living people
Italian speedway riders

Year of birth missing (living people)